The South Australian Railways 930 class was a class of diesel-electric locomotives built for the South Australian Railways between 1955 and 1967 by AE Goodwin, Auburn, New South Wales, the Australian licensee of the American Locomotive Company (Alco). Based on the Alco DL500B World series model, they were fitted with Alco 12-251B four-stroke V12 turbocharged diesel engines that developed  for traction. The first six of the class had a driving cab at one end only; the remaining 31 locomotives had two. The latter series, up-rated, were the basis of the almost identical New South Wales 44 class, of which 100 were built from 1957.

History

The first six (single-ended) locomotives were delivered in 1955 and 1956 to operate over the steeply graded Adelaide to Tailem Bend line and onwards to Serviceton. A further 31 (double-ended) entered service between July 1957 and June 1967 and operated across the broad-gauge network. The double-ended locomotives had a "bulldog" nose at the "A" end (not as round as the Clyde–GM "Bulldog nose" type) and were flat at the "B" end at. All were delivered with broad-gauge bogies and worked across the South Australian Railways network. In hot weather, crews frequently marshalled the locomotives with the "B" end leading so that the front door could be opened to provide more air circulation.

In March 1978, all were included in the transfer of the South Australian Railways to Australian National. From 1982, some were converted to standard gauge using bogies from State Rail Authority 44 class locomotives hauling trains from Adelaide to Whyalla and Broken Hill. On the broad gauge, some began operating through to Melbourne in the mid-1980s.

In 1986, a new computer system required the class leaders of the former South Australian Railways to be renumbered as the last member of the class, with 930 becoming 967.

Withdrawals commenced in 1986; only two remained by January 1994. Only 961 was included in the sale of Australian National's freight operations to Australian Southern Railroad in November 1997. In May 2001 it was sold to Silverton Rail as 44s1. In March 2005 it passed to Chicago Freight Car Leasing Australia.

Disposition
, the disposition of the four remaining members of the class was as follows:

Bibliography

References

A. E. Goodwin locomotives
Co-Co locomotives
Railway locomotives introduced in 1955
930
Standard gauge locomotives of Australia
Broad gauge locomotives in Australia
Diesel-electric locomotives of Australia
Streamlined diesel locomotives